Kasvukipuja is the third studio album by Finnish rapper Cheek. It was released on 18 April 2007. The album peaked at number 19 on the Official Finnish Album Chart.

Track listing

Charts

Release history

References

2007 albums
Cheek (rapper) albums